Leptodeira approximans is a species of snake in the family Colubridae.  The species is native to Ecuador, Peru, and Colombia.

References

Leptodeira
Snakes of South America
Reptiles of Ecuador
Reptiles of Peru
Reptiles of Colombia
Reptiles described in 1872
Taxa named by Albert Günther